Choi Wan South is one of the 25 constituencies of the Wong Tai Sin District Council. The seat elects one member of the council every four years. Since its creation in 1999, the seat has continuously been held by the Democratic Party, and was held by Shum Wan-wa.

Councillors represented

Election results

2010s

2000s

1990s

References

2011 District Council Election Results (Wong Tai Sin)
2007 District Council Election Results (Wong Tai Sin)
2003 District Council Election Results (Wong Tai Sin)
1999 District Council Election Results (Wong Tai Sin)

Constituencies of Hong Kong
Constituencies of Wong Tai Sin District Council
1999 establishments in Hong Kong
Constituencies established in 1999
Ngau Chi Wan